Kurtna may refer to several places in Estonia:

Kurtna, Harju County, village in Saku Parish, Harju County
Kurtna, Ida-Viru County, village in Illuka Parish, Ida-Viru County
Kurtna, Lääne-Viru County, village in Väike-Maarja Parish, Lääne-Viru County